Zentrygon is a bird genus in the pigeon and dove family (Columbidae). Its members are called quail-doves and all live in the Neotropics.

The  species of this genus primarily range from southern Mexico throughout Central America. Quail-doves are ground-dwelling birds that live, nest, and feed in dense forests. They are remarkable for their purple to brown coloration with light-and-dark facial markings.
 
The genus was introduced in 2013 with buff-fronted quail-dove as the type species. It contains the following eight species:

 Tuxtla quail-dove or Veracruz quail-dove, Zentrygon carrikeri
 Buff-fronted quail-dove or Costa Rica quail-dove, Zentrygon costaricensis
 Purplish-backed quail-dove, Zentrygon lawrencii
 White-faced quail-dove, Zentrygon albifacies
 White-throated quail-dove, Zentrygon frenata
 Lined quail-dove, Zentrygon linearis
 Chiriqui quail-dove, Zentrygon chiriquensis
 Russet-crowned quail-dove, Zentrygon goldmani
Cladogram showing the position of Zentrygon among its closest relatives:

References

AOU taxonomic changes 2014 Auk:14-24.1

 
Bird genera